"She's a Superstar" is a song by the English rock band the Verve. It was released as the band's second single in the United Kingdom on 22 June 1992. It reached number 66 on the UK Singles Chart. "She's a Superstar" and "Feel" were recorded during early 1992 in the swimming pool at The Manor Studio because, according to Miles Aldridge, the pool had a "beautiful echo effect with the music going over the water...there was a lot of smoking and acid involved in that session."

A music video was shot for this song in Thor's Cave, Staffordshire; this was the same cave pictured on the front of Verve's album A Storm in Heaven, and also features in the music video for Blue.

The cover of this single was taken on Snake Pass, Glossop, Derbyshire, England and was the basis for their greatest hits album, This Is Music: The Singles 92–98.

Track listings
 12-inch and CD single (HUTCD 16; HUTT 16)
 She's a Superstar – 8:56
 Feel – 10:42

 7-inch single (HUT 16) 
 "She's a Superstar (edit) – 5:03
 "Feel" – 10:42

References

External links
 Music video

The Verve songs
1992 singles
1992 songs
Hut Records singles
Songs written by Nick McCabe
Songs written by Peter Salisbury
Songs written by Richard Ashcroft
Songs written by Simon Jones (musician)